Yuriy Smirnov may refer to:

 Yuri Smirnov (actor) (born 1938), in films such as Bumbarash
 Yuri Andreyevich Smirnov (born 1923), Russian linguist
 Yuri Smirnov (footballer) (fl. 1972–1976), for clubs such as FC Torpedo Moscow
 Yuriy Smirnov (governor), Governor of Donetsk Oblast
 Yuriy Smirnov (minister) (born 1948), Ukrainian Minister of Internal Affairs

See also
 Smirnov (surname)
 Smirnoff (surname)